Carrefour Mobile is a French, Spanish, Italian, Greek, Polish and Belgian mobile virtual network operator (MVNO), part of the Carrefour Group.

References

External links
 

Telecommunications
Telecommunications companies
Mobile telecommunications
Telecommunications in France
Telecommunications in Spain
Telecommunications in Italy
Telecommunications in Greece
Telecommunications in Poland
Telecommunications in Belgium